Hsiao Tsung-huang is a Taiwanese museum curator and politician.

Career
Huang was educated at Chinese Culture University and the Taipei National University of the Arts, where he earned a bachelor's degree in fine arts and a master's degree in arts administration, respectively. He was director of the Kaohsiung Museum of Fine Arts between 2001 and 2004, when he assumed the same role at the National Taiwan Museum. Hsiao began working for the Ministry of Culture in May 2012, and rose to chief secretary-general. He left the culture ministry in 2015 to become director of the National Taiwan Museum of Fine Arts, and also chaired the Chinese Association of Museums. Hsiao returned to the ministry of culture in August 2018, succeeding Yang Tzu-pao as deputy culture minister. In January 2023, Hsiao was named director of the National Palace Museum.

References

Living people
Government ministers of Taiwan
Directors of National Palace Museum
Chinese Culture University alumni
Taipei National University of the Arts alumni
Year of birth missing (living people)